The following are the major dams and reservoirs located in Andhra Pradesh.
The Andhra Pradesh is well known for its fertile lands, plains and has the most Dams, Reservoirs, Lakes, Ponds, Wells,  and Canals across Eastern Ghats of India. It also has second largest river delta consisting river systems of Krishna and Godavari rivers in the country.

List of Major Irrigation dams and reservoirs in Andhra Pradesh
Existing & Proposed Major dams and reservoirs:

List of Major Lift Irrigation Projects in Andhra Pradesh 

Existing & Proposed Lift Irrigation Projects:

See also

Eastern Ghats
Krishna River
Godavari River
Tungabhadra River
Vamsadhara River
Nagavali River
Penna River
Palar River
Gosthani River
Chitravathi River
Gundlakamma River
Swarnamukhi River

References

Andhra Pradesh-related lists
 
 
Lists of tourist attractions in Andhra Pradesh